Planta  is a village in the administrative district of Gmina Wohyń, within Radzyń Podlaski County, Lublin Voivodeship, in eastern Poland.

References

Planta